Carl Kenneth "Moose" Mulleneaux (September 16, 1914 – January 23, 1995) was a professional American football end in the National Football League. He played six seasons for the Green Bay Packers (1938–1941, 1945–1946).  He was inducted into the Green Bay Packers Hall of Fame in 1983. Mulleneaux's brother Lee Mulleneaux also played briefly for the Packers.

After retiring from the Packers in 1946 due to injuries (in particular a vicious hit delivered by John Schiechl during a punt return), Mulleneaux coached football at the University of St. Louis, Texas Tech, Arizona, Fullerton College, and finally Santa Monica College. Mulleneaux was part of the coaching staff that took the SMCC Corsairs to an undefeated season, and the Junior Rose Bowl championship in 1958. Nicknamed "Moose", Mulleneaux also served as the Corsairs Golf coach for many years, garnering Coach of the Year honors along the way.

After retiring from coaching, Mulleneaux returned to the Phoenix, Arizona area and was active in NFL Alumni charity functions.

References

External links

1914 births
1995 deaths
American football ends
Arizona Wildcats football coaches
Bainbridge Commodores football players
Great Lakes Navy Bluejackets football players
Green Bay Packers players
Texas Tech Red Raiders football coaches
Utah State Aggies football players
Sportspeople from Phoenix, Arizona
Players of American football from Phoenix, Arizona